Radostów may refer to the following places:
Radostów, Lublin Voivodeship (east Poland)
Radostów, Świętokrzyskie Voivodeship (south-central Poland)
Radostów, West Pomeranian Voivodeship (north-west Poland)